Carl Knud Johnson (born December 26, 1949) is a former American football offensive lineman who played two seasons with the New Orleans Saints of the National Football League (NFL). He was drafted by the Saints in the fifth round of the 1972 NFL Draft. He first enrolled at Phoenix Junior College before transferring to the University of Nebraska–Lincoln. Johnson attended South Mountain High School in Phoenix, Arizona. He was also a member of the Portland Storm of the World Football League.

References

External links
Just Sports Stats

Living people
1949 births
Players of American football from Phoenix, Arizona
American football offensive linemen
Phoenix Bears football players
Nebraska Cornhuskers football players
New Orleans Saints players
Portland Storm players